is a song by Japanese entertainer Akina Nakamori. Written by Takashi Matsumoto and Tetsuya Komuro, it was released as a double-A single with "Kataomoi" on March 24, 1994, by MCA Victor. It was also the second single from her 15th studio album Unbalance+Balance.

Background 
"Aibu" was one of two songs written by Matsumoto and Komuro (the other being "Norma Jean") for Unbalance+Balannce, which was in production since summer 1992 to the album's release on September 22, 1993. It was originally planned to be released as Nakamori's first single under MCA Victor, but "Everlasting Love" was ultimately chosen instead. "Aibu" was eventually selected as the double A-side of "Kataomoi", a song originally made popular by Mie Nakao in the 1970s.

Chart performance 
"Kataomoi"/"Aibu" peaked at No. 17 on Oricon's weekly singles chart and sold over 133,900 copies.

Track listing

Charts

References

External links 
 
 

1994 singles
1994 songs
Akina Nakamori songs
Japanese-language songs
Songs with lyrics by Takashi Matsumoto (lyricist)
Songs written by Tetsuya Komuro
Universal Music Japan singles
MCA Records singles